Albert Allick Bowlly (7 January 1898 – 17 April 1941) was a Mozambican-born South African–British vocalist and jazz guitarist, who was popular during the 1930s in Britain. He recorded more than 1,000 songs.

His most popular songs include "Midnight, the Stars and You", "Goodnight, Sweetheart", "Close Your Eyes", "The Very Thought of You", "Guilty", "Heartaches" and "Love Is the Sweetest Thing". He also recorded the only English version of "Dark Eyes" by Adalgiso Ferraris, as "Black Eyes", with the words of Albert Mellor.

Early life
Al Bowlly was a Mozambican-born South African–British vocalist and jazz guitarist. 
He was born in 1898 in Lourenço Marques (today Maputo) in the Portuguese colony of Mozambique. His father, Alick Pauli was Greek by nationality. By religion he was Greek Orthodox. While Al's mother, born Miriam Ayoub-NeeJame, was Lebanese and Catholic by religion. They met en route to Australia and moved to South Africa. Bowlly was brought up in Johannesburg.

Career
After a series of odd jobs in South Africa, including barber and jockey, he sang in a dance band led by Edgar Adeler on a tour of South Africa, Rhodesia, India and the Dutch East Indies during the mid-1920s. He was fired from the band in Soerabaja, Dutch East Indies.

Jimmy Liquime hired him to sing with the band in India and Singapore. In 1927 Bowlly made his first record, a cover version of "Blue Skies" by Irving Berlin that was recorded with Adeler in Berlin, Germany. During the next year, he worked in London, with the orchestra of Fred Elizalde.

The onset of the Great Depression in 1929 resulted in Bowlly losing his job; he returned to several months of busking to survive. In the 1930s, he signed two contracts – one in May 1931 with Roy Fox, singing in his live band for the Monseigneur Restaurant, a stylish restaurant on Piccadilly in London, the other a record contract with bandleader Ray Noble in November 1930.

During the next four years, he recorded over 500 songs. By 1933, Lew Stone had ousted Fox as the Monseigneur's bandleader and Bowlly was singing Stone's arrangements with Stone's band. After much radio exposure and a successful British tour with Stone, Bowlly was inundated with demands for appearances and gigs – including undertaking a solo British tour – but continued to make most of his recordings with Noble. There was considerable competition between Noble and Stone for Bowlly's time. For much of the year, Bowlly spent the day in the recording studio with Noble's band, rehearsing and recording, then the evening with Stone's band at the Monseigneur. Many of these recordings with Noble were issued in the United States by Victor, which meant that by the time Noble and Bowlly came to America, their reputation had preceded them.

Bowlly performed in England with his band, the Radio City Rhythm Makers. By 1937, the band had broken up when vocal problems were traced to a wart in his throat, briefly causing him to lose his voice. Separated from his wife and with his band dissolved, he borrowed money from friends and travelled to New York City for surgery.

His absence from the UK in the early 1930s damaged his popularity with British audiences, despite his association with pianist Monia Liter as his accompanist. His career began to suffer as a result of problems with his voice, which affected the frequency of his recordings. He played a few small parts in films, but the parts were often cut and scenes that were shown were brief. Noble was offered a role in Hollywood, although the offer excluded Bowlly because a singer had already been hired. Bowlly moved back to London with his wife Marjie in January 1937.

With diminished success in Britain, he toured regional theatres and recorded as often as possible to make a living, moving from orchestra to orchestra, working with Sydney Lipton, Geraldo and Ken "Snakehips" Johnson. In 1940, there was a revival of interest in his career when he worked in a duo with Jimmy Messene in Radio Stars with Two Guitars on the London stage. It was his last venture before his death in April 1941. The partnership was uneasy; Messene was an alcoholic and he was occasionally unable to perform. Bowlly recorded his last song two weeks before his death. It was a duet with Messene of Irving Berlin's satirical song about Hitler, "When That Man Is Dead and Gone".

Personal life and death
In December 1931, Bowlly married Constance Freda Roberts (died 1934) in St Martin's Register Office, London; the couple separated after a fortnight and sought a divorce. He remarried in December 1934 to Marjie Fairless; this marriage lasted until his death.

On 16 April 1941, Bowlly and Messene had given a performance at the Rex Cinema in Oxford Street, High Wycombe. Both were offered an overnight stay in town, but Bowlly took the last train home to his flat at 32 Duke Street, Duke's Court, St James, London. He was killed by a Luftwaffe parachute mine that detonated outside his flat at ten past three in the morning. His body appeared unmarked. Although the explosion had not disfigured him, it had blown his bedroom door off its hinges, and the impact against his head was fatal. He was buried with other bombing victims in a mass grave at Hanwell Cemetery, Uxbridge Road, Hanwell, where his name is given as Albert Alex Bowlly.

A blue plaque commemorating Bowlly was installed in November 2013 by English Heritage at Charing Cross Mansion, 26 Charing Cross Road, described as "his home at the pinnacle of his career".

Legacy
Al Bowlly's cover songs have been widely included in other forms of media. One musician noted the public's opinion that if Bowlly did not die in the war, he would have been "bigger than Bing Crosby," and that "he had a better voice."

Dennis Potter's television play Moonlight on the Highway, first broadcast in the UK on 12 April 1969, focused on a young Al Bowlly obsessively attempting to blot out memories of sexual abuse via his fixation with the singer. Potter would go on to feature Bowlly's music in Pennies from Heaven (1978).

Bowlly was mentioned and his songs were used throughout the first few series of the British TV comedy Goodnight Sweetheart.

Bowlly's rendition of "Midnight, the Stars and You" has been particularly used and referenced throughout varied films, appearing in The Shining, Toy Story 4, and Ready Player One. Some commentators specifically highlight its use in The Shinings ending scene, with HeadStuffs Luka Vukos calling it "haunting" and Screen Rant praising it as "one of the most unforgettable final shots in movie history." The song has also been used in the 2013 video game BioShock Infinite: Burial at Sea and sampled by musician Leyland Kirby on the Caretaker's Shining-inspired album Selected Memories from the Haunted Ballroom.

From 2016 to 2019, Al Bowlly's cover of "Heartaches" would be sampled multiple times on the Caretaker's series of albums named Everywhere at the End of Time. Along with other big band songs, Kirby applied distortion and reverb effects to "Heartaches" as the series progressed to explore the advancement of dementia through six stages. Most notably, the song was sampled on Stage 1s opening track "It's Just a Burning Memory", which takes its title from the song's lyrics.

Richard Thompson wrote a song called 'Al Bowlly's In Heaven' included on his album Daring Adventures.

Al Bowlly and/or his music is referred to in the following novels:

 A Good Clean Fight by Derek Robinson
 The Eagle Has Flown by Jack Higgins

Partial discography

References

Further reading
 Sid Colin and Tony Staveacre, Al Bowlly (H. Hamilton, 1979)
 Ray Pallett, Good-Night, Sweetheart: Life and Times of Al Bowlly (Spellmount, 1986)
 Ray Pallett, They Called Him Al: The Musical Life of Al Bowlly (BearManor Media, 2010)

External links
 Al Bowlly recordings at the Discography of American Historical Recordings.

1898 births
1941 deaths
British male singer-songwriters
British pop singers
British people of Lebanese descent
British jazz singers
British civilians killed in World War II
Deaths by airstrike during World War II
Singers from Johannesburg
People from Maputo
20th-century British male singers
Deaths from head injury
Mozambican emigrants to South Africa
Brunswick Records artists
RCA Victor artists